Moon Mountain District Sonoma County is an American Viticultural Area (AVA) within  Sonoma Valley and North Coast viticultural areas, just north of the city of  Sonoma. This mountainous region on the very eastern edge of  Sonoma County has a historic reputation for producing rich, intensely-flavored wines from Cabernet Sauvignon and Syrah varietals since the 1880s. The District was established on November 1, 2013 by the Alcohol and Tobacco Tax and Trade Bureau (TTB). Its name is derived from Moon Mountain Road, which traverses through the area and itself a reference to Sonoma, which means 'valley of the moon' in the local Native American dialect.

Terroir
The distinguishing features of Moon Mountain District are its topography, geology, climate, and soils. It lies in one of the warmer parts of Sonoma County due to its inland location. The district's boundaries are outlined by proceeding south along the mountain ridge from the  Rutherford locale down the meandering Sonoma-Napa County boundary to the Sonoma-Napa county southeast intersection; then travels southwesterly in a straight line north of Arrowhead Mountain toward the Pueblo lands of Sonoma; the boundary then proceeds northwesterly along the western foothills pass the locales of Eldridge, Glen Ellen, through the Valley of the Moon and settling in the Kenwood vicinity; finally, turning east-northeasterly it proceeds to a marked 1,483-foot peak south of Sugarloaf Ridge and then east-southeasterly in a straight line back to the Sonoma-Napa County boundary.

Climate
Crosswinds from both the Pacific Ocean to the west and San Pablo Bay in the south bring cooling maritime influences to the vineyards, but by the time the winds have travelled across the valley floor they have warmed considerably. Most of the region's vineyards face southwest, subjecting them to stronger afternoon sunlight. The higher elevation vineyards places their varietals above the influence of the famous Sonoma fog. The warmer climate gives Moon Mountain District a longer growing season than other parts of Sonoma Valley, with earlier budburst in the spring and a longer hang time for the grapes in the autumn. Cold air tends to drain off the hillside vineyards into the valley, reducing the risk of damaging frosts and allowing for a long, slow maturation period. As a result, Moon Mountain District grapes have a good balance of sugars and acidity, leading to well-balanced wines.

Soil
Moon Mountain's volcanic origins gave the area's winemakers cause to petition for a separate AVA title, which was approved in 2013. The region's iron-rich volcanic soils are quite distinct from the sedimentary soils of the surrounding area. These red, rocky soils are thin, well-drained and therefore highly suited to viticulture. Louis M. Martini's famed Monte Rosso vineyard, a 120-year-old vineyard within the appellation, is named for these red soils.

Wine Industry
TTB received a petition from Patrick L. Shabram on behalf of Christian Borcher, a representative of the vintners and grape growers in the area, proposed the establishment of the “Moon Mountain District Sonoma County” AVA.  Moon Mountain contains 11 wineries and 40 commercially-producing vineyards that cultivate approximately  well-established throughout the mountainous area around the hills and ridges.

References

External links 
 Moon Mountain Wine Region and Appellation Sonoma County Tourism
 
  TTB AVA Map

 
American Viticultural Areas of California
American Viticultural Areas
California wine
Geography of Sonoma County, California
2013 establishments in California